Battler is a 2009 album from indie-rock artist Gregory Douglass. The first video from the record will be "Cathedrals," as stated on www.gregorydouglass.com

On the record, Gregory experiments with cabaret themes and heavy, striking instrumentation, which is a departure from the piano and guitar work on this previous records. The record features fellow Vermont artists Grace Potter of the Nocturnals, as well as Anaïs Mitchell.

The Battler Tour 
To promote the record, Gregory went on The Battler Tour in the Winter of 2009. The show opened in Cambridge, MA and traveled all throughout the United States. Opening acts varied and included Chad Perrone. The setlist contained many tracks from the new album as well as material from his previous albums Teeter, Pseudo-Rotary and Up & Away. Many of the tracks were reinvented to suit a full-band including guitar, drums, keyboards, backing vocals, and a cello.

Track listing 
All songs by Gregory Douglass.

 "Broken Through"
 "Cathedrals"
 "Devotion"
 "Day of the Battler"
 "No Apology"
 "Stay"
 "Madeline"
 "Sadly"
 "This Is My Life"
 "Lifeline"
 "Harlequin"
 "Ordinary Man"

References

External links 
 Lyrics

2009 albums
Gregory Douglass albums